Midnight Crossing is a 1988 American mystery thriller film directed by Roger Holzberg. The film stars Faye Dunaway, Daniel J. Travanti, Kim Cattrall, John Laughlin, and Ned Beatty.

Plot
What begins as a pleasure cruise turns out to be a treasure hunt for two couples, sight-impaired Helen Barton and her husband, Morely, who is a former naval officer, and Jeff and Alexa Schubb.

A million dollars supposedly is buried on a small isle between Florida and Cuba, so the four of them decide to go after it. Their lives become in danger from natives and pirates, as well as from the greed that overwhelms their group.

Cast
 Faye Dunaway as Helen Barton
 Daniel J. Travanti as Morely Barton
 Kim Cattrall as Alexa Schubb
 John Laughlin as Jeff Schubb
 Ned Beatty as Ellis
 Pedro De Pool as Captain Mendoza

Reception
The film received mixed reviews. Of the film the Los Angeles Times noted, "There's something about its willingness to shove the subject past reasonable bounds—right into the blackest depths of character degeneration and emotional hysteria—that almost commands respect."

Box office
Midnight Crossing was not a success. The producers owed money to cinema companies because of the film's commercial failure.

References

External links
 
 
 

1988 films
1988 independent films
1980s mystery thriller films
American independent films
American mystery thriller films
Films set in the Caribbean
Films shot in Miami
Seafaring films
Treasure hunt films
1980s English-language films
1980s American films